Sensory may refer to:

Biology 
 Sensory ecology, how organisms obtain information about their environment
 Sensory neuron, nerve cell responsible for transmitting information about external stimuli
 Sensory perception, the process of acquiring and interpreting sensory information
 Sensory receptor, a structure that recognizes external stimuli
 Sensory system, part of the nervous system of organisms

Business and brands 
 Sensory, Inc., an American speech technology company

Other uses
 Sensory analysis, a consumer product-testing method
 Sensory garden, a self-contained garden area that allows visitors to enjoy a wide variety of sensory experiences

See also 
 Sensor
 Sense (disambiguation)